General Farrell may refer to:

Edelmiro Julián Farrell (1887–1980), Argentine general and de facto president of Argentina from 1944 to 1946
Francis William Farrell (1900—1981), U.S. Army lieutenant general
Sean M. Farrell (fl. 1990s–2020s), U.S. Air Force major general
Thomas Farrell (United States Army officer) (1891–1967), U.S. Army major general